Elvis Javier González Herrera  (born February 20, 1982) is a Colombian footballer who currently plays for Atlético Huila as a right back in the Categoría Primera A of Colombia.

Honors

Club
Cúcuta Deportivo
 Primera A (1): 2006–II

References

External links

1982 births
Living people
Colombian footballers
Colombia international footballers
Categoría Primera A players
Independiente Santa Fe footballers
Cúcuta Deportivo footballers
Deportivo Pereira footballers
La Equidad footballers
Atlético Huila footballers
Águilas Doradas Rionegro players
Real Cartagena footballers
Jaguares de Córdoba footballers
Association football fullbacks
People from Córdoba Department
21st-century Colombian people